Such Women Are Dangerous is a 1934 American drama film directed by James Flood, written by Oscar M. Sheridan, Jane Storm and Lenore Coffee, and starring Warner Baxter, Rosemary Ames, Rochelle Hudson, Mona Barrie, Herbert Mundin and Henrietta Crosman. It was released on June 8, 1934, by Fox Film Corporation.

Plot

Cast    
Warner Baxter as Michael Shawn
Rosemary Ames as Helen Hallock
Rochelle Hudson as Vernie Little
Mona Barrie as Wanda Paris
Herbert Mundin as Horatio Hollingsworth Wilson
Henrietta Crosman as Aunt Sophie Travers
Lily D. Stuart as Ellison
Irving Pichel as Stanley
Jane Barnes as Nancy Ryan
Matt Moore as George Ryan
Richard Carle as Thomas H. Delahanty
Murray Kinnell as Jan Paris
Frank Conroy as Bronson
Fred Santley as Hinton
John Sheehan as Granigan
Addison Richards as Delange
Bodil Rosing as Helma
Douglas Scott as Josef Paris
James Burke as Detective

References

External links
 

1934 films
1930s English-language films
American drama films
1934 drama films
Fox Film films
Films directed by James Flood
American black-and-white films
1930s American films